Baryglossa bequaerti is a species of tephritid or fruit flies in the genus Baryglossa of the family Tephritidae.

References

Blepharoneurinae
Insects described in 1924